is a Japanese manga series written and illustrated by Kazumi Yamashita. It was serialized in Kodansha's seinen manga magazine Morning from March 2014 to July 2020, with its chapters collected in 11 tankōbon volumes.

Publication
Written and illustrated by Kazumi Yamashita, Land serialized in Kodansha's seinen manga magazine Morning from March 13, 2014, to July 9, 2020. Kodansha collected its chapters in eleven tankōbon volumes, released from October 23, 2014, to September 18, 2020.

Reception
Land placed 13th on Takarajimasha's Kono Manga ga Sugoi! ranking of top 20 manga for male readers in 2016. The series ranked 50th, alongside What Did You Eat Yesterday?, on Da Vinci magazine's 17th annual "Book of the Year" 2017 list. In December 2019, Brutus magazine included the series on their "Most Dangerous Manga" list, which included works with the most "stimulating" and thought-provoking themes. The series won the 25th Tezuka Osamu Cultural Prize's Grand Prize in 2021.

References

External links
  
 

Kodansha manga
Seinen manga
Winner of Tezuka Osamu Cultural Prize (Grand Prize)